Omoikane may refer to:

Omoikane (Shinto) is the god of knowledge in Shinto
Omoikane (Nadesico) is the main computer of the Nadesico starship from the series Martian Successor Nadesico